Bill Elliott's NASCAR Challenge is a video game developed by Distinctive Software and published by Konami and was released for MS-DOS, Amiga, Macintosh and Nintendo Entertainment System in 1991.

A very similar game, Bill Elliott's NASCAR Fast Tracks, was released for the Game Boy in 1991 by Konami.

This game is the first video game to ever secure the NASCAR license. It features several real NASCAR tracks in the game, such as Watkins Glen and Talladega. This game is also the first to feature a real NASCAR driver in a PC game, Bill Elliott.

Gameplay
Bill Elliott's NASCAR Challenge is a racing game simulation of the NASCAR Winston Cup circuit. Gameplay is always seen from an in-car perspective.

Before the race starts players can choose their car. There are three different racecars to choose from. A Pontiac Grand Prix, a Ford Thunderbird, and a Chevrolet Lumina.

Players could choose to run single races at each track, or run for the season championship. The race distances ranged from 10 miles to a more realistic distance of 500 miles for the superspeedway races. In the MS-DOS version, the championship consisted of a visit to each of the eight tracks. In the NES and Game Boy versions, the season championship consisted of each of the four tracks run twice, for a total of eight races. Championship points were awarded consistent to the real-life Winston Cup of the time.

Contest

In 1991, Konami sponsored a contest where players could submit top scores for a chance to win a trip to the 1992 Daytona 500 to meet Bill Elliott, and a 1992 Ford Thunderbird. To enter, players were to send 35mm photographs of their final championship score using full race distances, manual transmission and regular damage settings.

Reception

References

1991 video games
Amiga games
DOS games
Konami games
Classic Mac OS games
NASCAR video games
Nintendo Entertainment System games
North America-exclusive video games
Video games based on real people
Video games developed in Canada
Distinctive Software games
Single-player video games